The GEO Group Australia Pty Ltd is an Australian subsidiary of American company The GEO Group Inc., responsible for the delivery of outsourced and privatised correctional services in Australia. Its head office is on Level 18 in the National Mutual Centre in the Sydney CBD in the City of Sydney, Sydney, New South Wales.

The company was founded in 1991 as Australasian Correctional Management Pty, Ltd.

Facilities 

Prisons managed by GEO Group Australia include;
 Junee Correctional Centre, under contract with Corrective Services NSW
 Arthur Gorrie Correctional Centre, under contract with Queensland Corrective Services
 Parklea Correctional Centre (until April 1st 2019), under contract with Corrective Services NSW 
 Fulham Correctional Centre, with the separate 60-inmate capacity juvenile detention facility Nalu at Fulham Correctional Centre, both under contract with Corrections Victoria
 Ravenhall Correctional Centre, a 1000-bed prison in Melbourne, Victoria, under contract with Corrections Victoria.

References

External links

 

GEO Group
Utility companies of Australia
Prisons in Australia
Prison and correctional agencies
Companies based in Sydney
Private prisons in Australia
Australian subsidiaries of foreign companies